Heriberto Ramón Morales Cortés (born 10 March 1975) is a Mexican former footballer who played as a defender.

Morales began his career with Monarcas Morelia in the 1995–96 season, playing as a central or left-sided defender. By 1996, he had become a starter for the majority of Morelia's matches, and he stayed with the club through 2002, winning the Invierno 2000 championship in the process. In 2003, he moved to Chivas, playing one year there, and he spent his last career years playing for Chiapas. Morales ended his Mexico league top-tier career with Jaguares in 2007.

He scored the goal in the penalty shootout that won the championship for Morelia against Toluca in 2000.

In addition, Morales earned 12 caps for the Mexico national team. He was called by national coach Javier Aguirre for the 2001 Copa America, appearing in five matches as Mexico advanced to the final. Morales also appeared in three qualifiers for the 2002 FIFA World Cup, scoring an own goal against Jamaica on September 2, 2001 and starting subsequent matches against Trinidad & Tobago and Costa Rica. Although he played in several preparation matches prior to the World Cup, Morales was not included in Aguirre's final 23-man squad.

Honours
Morelia
Mexican Primera División: Invierno 2000

References

External links
 
 

1975 births
Living people
Liga MX players
Atlético Morelia players
Association football defenders
Mexico international footballers
2001 Copa América players
Sportspeople from Morelia
Footballers from Michoacán
Mexican footballers
Chiapas F.C. footballers
C.D. Guadalajara footballers